A number of ships have been named Beme, including –

 SS Beme (1904), a Panamanian tanker in service until sunk by enemy action in 1940
 , a Burmese tanker in service 1946–64

Ship names